Louis Salleron (15 August 1905 – 20 January 1992) was a French author, journalist and Catholic theoretician. 
He was right-wing, with monarchist sympathies, and an advocate of agricultural corporatism.
During the early years of the Vichy Regime in World War II (1939–45) he played a leading role in establishing the Peasant Corporation.
He continued to publish books and articles after the war, and was an outspoken opponent of the Vatican II reforms to the Catholic church.

Life

Early years (1905–39)

Louis Salleron was born on 15 August 1905.
He was the brother of the journalist and writer Paul Sérant (Paul Salleron).
He was close to the Henri, Count of Paris.
From the mid-1930s he was a theoretician of agricultural corporatism, looking for a "third way" between Liberalism and Socialism. 
He was active in the National Union of Agricultural Unions (UNSA), and from 1935 worked with the L'Institut d'études corporatives et sociales (IECS).
His thesis in law, sustained in 1937, was entitled L'évolution de l'agriculture française, du régime foncier au régime corporatif.
He was a professor of political economics at the Catholic Institute of Paris from 1937 to 1957.
At the Peasant Congress at Caen on 5–7 May 1937 Jacques Le Roy Ladurie, influenced by Rémy Goussault and Louis Salleron, invited the leading conservative agrarians to declare their support for corporatism.
The weekly Syndicats paysans, co-edited by Salleron and Le Roy Ladurie, first appeared on 1 July 1937.

World War II (1939–45)

Under the Vichy government Salleron played a leading role in introducing the Peasant Corporation.
As the semi-official theoretician of the UNSA he was the main author of the draft law of September 1940 on the Corporation Paysanne, which would create a corporative structure in agriculture.
After many revision and some opposition from the Germans the Peasant Charter was promulgated on 2 December 1940.
Salleron was made the corporation's delegate-general for economic and social questions.
Salleron, speaking out against the "liberalo-Marxist error", advocated "the wholesale reservation of the present structure of the peasantry, which demographically, economically, socially and morally amounts to near-perfection."
The corporation struggled to become effective, handicapped by a temporary structure, internal conflicts, and actions by the Ministry of Agriculture that reduced its authority and introduced reforms without consultation.
By the end of the first  year Salleron gave vent to his frustration,

In response, Salleron was dismissed from his position in the Corporation in late 1941, and the weekly Syndicats paysans was closed soon after.
Towards the end of the war Salleron was starting to take a more realistic view of the necessary reforms.
In 1944 he created draft proposals for agricultural planning in the postwar period, for large-scale technical assistance to reduce costs, and for farm equipment cooperatives.

Later years (1945–92)

After the war Salleron continued to publish in monarchist or Catholic journals such as Fédération, La France catholique and La Nation française.
He led conferences on corporatist thought at the Centre d'études politiques, économiques et civiques (CEPEC), which was founded in 1954.
In 1956 Salleron and Jean Madiran founded the journal Itinéraires, which later became a leading organ for criticism of the reforms within the Catholic Church after the Second Vatican Council of 1962–65.
Louis Salleron died on 20 January 1992.

Works

Louis Salleron wrote more than fifty works on Liberalism and the Catholic faith.
He contributed to many reviews.
In 1942 the Académie française awarded the Academy Prize of 5,000 francs for his La Terre et le Travail.
In 1952 the Académie française awarded him the Prix J.-J. Weiss of 2,000 francs for Les Catholiques et le Capitalisme.
Publications include:

Notes

Sources

1905 births
1992 deaths
People from Sèvres
French traditionalist Catholics
People of Vichy France
French journalists
20th-century French journalists
French political writers